Ng Kui Chuen, better known by his stage name Ko Lo Chuen (1909 – May 13, 1988), was a Hong Kong actor. Ko and his brother began acting in the 1930s.

Biography 
Ko was born in 1909 as Ng Kui Chuen. He got his stage name based on his nickname describing his tall appearance. They both acted movies with martial arts star Bruce Lee in 1950 and 1960. In 1950, Ko acted as a secretary in Bruce Lee's film, The Kid. In 1960, his brother acted as a headmaster in Bruce Lee' film, The Orphan, Ko was also in the film. Before acting films, he was a teacher of a primary school. He died on May 13, 1988, at the age of 79.

Filmography 
 1937 Youth of China (film) 
 1950 The Kid - Secretary Ko
 1960 The Orphan
 1990 Kung Fu Vs. Acrobatic - Man in intro (From Buddah's Palm 1964)

References

External links 
Ko Lo-chuen at the Hong Kong Movie DataBase
http://www.hkcinemagic.com/en/people.asp?id=4224

1909 births
1988 deaths
Hong Kong male actors